Kilmorey Falls is a rural locality in the Maranoa Region, Queensland, Australia. In the  Kilmorey Falls had a population of 0 people.

Kilmorey Falls' postcode is 4465.

Geography 
The locality is bounded to the north-east by the Great Dividing Range.

The Waroonga State Forest is in the south-east of the locality and Walhallow State Forest in the east. Apart from these protected areas, the predominant land use is grazing on native vegetation with a small amount of crop growing in the south.

History 
The locality was officially named and bounded on 28 March 2002.

In the  Kilmorey Falls had a population of 0 people.

Economy 
There are a number of homesteads in the locality:

 Alcurah
 Claravale
 Eastern Creek
 Gap Plains
 Glenloch
 Katanga
 Kilmorey
 Mercura
 Mountain View
 Pinnacle
 Ventura
 Westwood

Education 
There are no schools in Kilmorey Falls. The nearest primary schools are Mitchell State School in neighbouring Mitchell to the south-west and Injune State School in Injune to the north-east. Both of these schools also provides secondary schooling to Year 10. There is no secondary schooling to Year 12 available nearby, the nearest being Roma State College in Roma to the south-east. Distance education and boarding schools would be other options.

References 

Maranoa Region
Localities in Queensland